The Choco tyrannulet (Zimmerius albigularis) is a species of bird in the family Tyrannidae, the tyrant flycatchers. It is found in forests in the Chocó of south-western Colombia and western Ecuador. It was previously treated as a conspecific with the golden-faced tyrannulet (Zimmerius chrysops) but the species were split based on the molecular and vocal differences. It is restricted to a region with extensive habitat destruction but it is generally fairly common and therefore unlikely to be seriously threatened.

References

Choco tyrannulet
Birds of the Tumbes-Chocó-Magdalena
Birds of Ecuador
Choco tyrannulet